Lang Suan may refer to
Lang Suan (town), Chumphon, Thailand
Lang Suan District, surrounding the town
Lang Suan River, mostly within the district
Lang Suan Province, a former Thai province, part of Monthon Surat, abolished in 1932
Lang Suan, a street in Bangkok's Pathum Wan District